From List of National Natural Landmarks, these are the National Natural Landmarks in Iowa.  There are 8 in total.

Iowa
National Natural Landmarks